David Wayne Pauley (born June 17, 1983) is an American former professional baseball pitcher. Pauley pitched for five Major League Baseball (MLB) teams from 2006 to 2012. He batted and threw right-handed.

Career

Early life
Pauley is a graduate of Longmont High School in Longmont, Colorado.

San Diego Padres
An eighth round pick by San Diego in 2001, Pauley posted a 7–12 record with a 4.17 ERA for the Padres' A-class affiliate, the Lake Elsinore Storm, as their seventh best prospect in 2004.

Boston Red Sox
On December 20, 2004, the Padres traded Pauley along with Jay Payton, Ramón Vázquez, and cash to the Boston Red Sox for Dave Roberts.

As a member of the Portland Sea Dogs rotation in 2005, he went 9–7 with 104 strikeouts and a 3.81 ERA in 156 innings pitched.

Pauley started 2006 in Portland. He posted a 2–3 record with a 2.39 ERA in 10 starts for the Sea Dogs before making his major league debut on May 31, starting for Boston in place of the injured David Wells. Pauley pitched 4.2 innings while allowing six runs on 11 hits in and 8-6 victory against the Toronto Blue Jays. He did not record a decision in the game. In his 16 innings pitched for the Red Sox, Pauley recorded a 7.88 ERA.

In 2007, Pauley was rated by Baseball America as the number 26 prospect in the Red Sox farm system. Pauley spent the entire 2007 season playing for the Pawtucket Red Sox. The Red Sox invited him to spring training in 2008, but sent him back to the minors on March 8, 2008. In January 2009, Pauley was designated for assignment in order to make room for the newly signed John Smoltz.

Baltimore Orioles
On January 19, 2009, Pauley was traded to the Baltimore Orioles for pitcher Randor Bierd.

Seattle Mariners
On December 22, 2009, Pauley signed a minor league contract with the Seattle Mariners. On August 13, 2010, he earned his first major league win, versus the Cleveland Indians.

Detroit Tigers
On July 30, 2011, Pauley was traded to the Detroit Tigers along with Doug Fister for Charlie Furbush, Casper Wells, Chance Ruffin and minor leaguer Francisco Martinez. Pauley was released by the Detroit Tigers on March 12, 2012 and became a free agent after clearing waivers on March 15.

Los Angeles Angels of Anaheim
The Angels signed Pauley to a minor league contract on March 23, 2012. He was called up to the majors on May 7, 2012, but was designated for assignment on May 24. Pauley cleared waivers and was then recalled to the Angels on June 12, 2012. He was designated for assignment a second time on June 18.

Toronto Blue Jays

Pauley was claimed by the Blue Jays on June 20 after being designated for assignment by the Angels for a second time. For the Blue Jays, Pauley sported a 0–1 record with a 6.48 ERA in 10 relief appearances. He was designated for assignment after he gave up three earned runs on three hits vs. the Kansas City Royals on July 2. On July 9, he elected free agency.

Seattle Mariners
The Seattle Mariners signed him to a minor league contract on July 12, and assigned him to the Triple-A Tacoma Rainiers on July 14.

Arizona Diamondbacks
On June 10, 2013, Pauley signed a minor-league deal with the Arizona Diamondbacks and was assigned to Triple-A Reno. After pitching in four games for the Aces, Pauley was released by the team. In those four games, he went 0–1, giving up 10 hits and seven runs in 5.2 innings.

Sugar Land Skeeters
On July 25, 2013, Pauley signed with the independent Sugar Land Skeeters of the Atlantic League of Professional Baseball. In 12 starts, he went 5–3 with a 3.44 ERA, striking out 52 in 68 innings. He became a free agent after the 2014 season.

Pitching style
Pauley is a sinkerball pitcher,  and as such his success relies on his ability to keep the ball down in the strike zone, and when contact is made, to get ground-ball outs. Pauley also has the standard fastball, curveball, and changeup in his repertoire. His fastball hits the high 80 MPH range and his curveball has more of a sweeping motion than the standard 12-to-6 movement seen from most minor-league pitchers.

References

External links

1983 births
Living people
American expatriate baseball players in Canada
Baseball players from Colorado
Boston Red Sox players
Detroit Tigers players
Eugene Emeralds players
Fort Wayne Wizards players
Idaho Falls Padres players
Lake Elsinore Storm players
Los Angeles Angels players
Major League Baseball pitchers
Naranjeros de Hermosillo players
American expatriate baseball players in Mexico
Norfolk Tides players
Pawtucket Red Sox players
Peoria Javelinas players
Portland Sea Dogs players
Reno Aces players
Salt Lake Bees players
Seattle Mariners players
Sportspeople from Boulder, Colorado
Sugar Land Skeeters players
Tacoma Rainiers players
Tiburones de La Guaira players
American expatriate baseball players in Venezuela
Toronto Blue Jays players